Fruitvale is a 2007 album by American musician Sonny Smith. The songs on the album make reference to the Oakland neighborhood of the same name.

Track listing
 "Day in the Life of a Heel"
 "Good Folks Bad Folks"
 "Mario"
 "Bad Cop"
 "Curtis on the Corner"
 "Mr. Low"
 "Private Dick"
 "Someday Land"
 "Another Waitress in Love"
 "I'm So Happy"

Personnel 
 Sonny Smith
Leroy Bach (wilco)
Dave Hilliard
Mathew Luz
Nora O'Connor
Edith Frost
Kelly Hogan

2006 albums